Ditassa is a genus of plant in the family Apocynaceae, first described as a genus in 1810. It is native to South America.

Species

formerly included
transferred to other genera (Blepharodon, Cynanchum, Macroditassa, Metastelma, Minaria, Oxypetalum, Tassadia)

References

Asclepiadoideae
Apocynaceae genera
Taxa named by Robert Brown (botanist, born 1773)